More Gravy! is the second studio album, by Australian blues band, Collard Greens & Gravy. At the ARIA Music Awards of 2001, the album won Best Blues and Roots Album. The group's line-up was James Bridges on guitar and fiddle, Ian Collard on lead vocals, harmonica and guitar, and Anthony Shortte on drums. It was recorded live-in-the-studio at Soundhouse Studios with production by John Dorr and the group.

Reception 

Australian musicologist, Ian McFarlane, described how the group's, "energetic foot-stomping, country blues sound tapped into the very roots of the genre." Patrick Donovan of The Age observed, "[their] local brand of swampy countrified electric blues has earned them a reputation as the best blues band in the land." Mark Watson observed, "Crisp woody vocals throughout coupled with [Collard]'s sizzling harmonica style, make this another stand-out album, one that yet again defies a justifiable description."

Track listing

More Gravy (2000) – Black Market Music 

 "You Put Your Spell on Me" - 2:59
 "Pretty Thing" - 2:40
 "Hate to See You Go" - 2:56
 "More Gravy" - 4:57
 "Leavin' You" - 4:05
 "Your Gonna Need My Help" - 4:01
 "Goin' Down South" - 5:16
 "Tell Me Babe" - 3:41
 "Gonna Wait Till a Change Come" - 3:17
 "Do My Thing"	- 3:40
 "Change My Ways" - 3:22
 "Gravy Groan"	- 2:51
 "Goin' Home" - 2:54
 "Cluck Ol' Hen" - 2:04

Personnel 

 James Bridges – guitar, fiddle
 Ian Collard – lead vocals, harmonica, guitar
 Anthony Shortte – drums

 John Dorr – producer
 Robert B Dillon – recording engineer, mixing engineer
 James Aitken – assistant engineer
 John Ruberto – mastering engineer
 Andrew Rosenfelt – booklet photographer
 Ross Campbell – back cover photographer
 Black Widow Graphic Design – cover design, artwork
 Charlotte Barker – cover concept

References

2000 albums
ARIA Award-winning albums